Žitava may refer to:
Žitava (river), a river in Slovakia
a part of the municipality Radvaň nad Dunajom
Zittau, Žitava being the Slavic name of the town in Germany

See also
Peace of Žitava, 1606 treaty that ended the Long War between Royal Hungary and the Ottoman Empire